Hyeong-won, Hyung-won, or Hyong-won is a Korean masculine given name. Its meaning differs based on the hanja used to write each syllable of the name. There are 21 hanja with the reading "hyeong" and 35 hanja with the reading "won" on the South Korean government's official list of hanja which may be registered for use in given names. 

People with this name include:
Yu Hyeong-won (1622–1673), Joseon Dynasty scholar-official
Cha Hyung-won (1890–1972), South Korean traditional stage actor for the Gangneung Danoje festival
Chae Hyung-won (born 1994), South Korean singer, member of boy band Monsta X

See also
List of Korean given names

References

Korean masculine given names